Estadio Rodrigo Paz Delgado, commonly called La Casa Blanca (Spanish for "The White House"), is a football stadium in Quito, Ecuador that is the home ground of LDU Quito. Built between 1995 and 1997, the stadium hosted its first match on March 6, 1997 in a game between LDU Quito and Atlético Mineiro of Belo Horizonte. At an altitude of 2,734 m and with a capacity of 41,575, it is the largest stadium in Quito, and the second largest in Ecuador after the Estadio Monumental Banco Pichincha in Guayaquil.

Since its inauguration, the stadium has been home to LDU Quito's greatest period of success where it has won six national titles and four international titles.

The Ecuador national team used this stadium twice during the 2002 FIFA World Cup qualification on March 29, 2000 against Venezuela and August 15, 2000 against Bolivia. Ecuador won both games.

Images

First match

References

External links

Stadium profile at LDU Quito's website 

Sports venues completed in 1997
Football venues in Quito
Estadio Rodrigo Paz Delgado
1997 establishments in South America